John Sleech was the Archdeacon of Cornwall from 1741 to 1788.

Sleech was from Farringdon, Devon.

References

Archdeacons of Cornwall
18th-century English Anglican priests
1788 deaths